Heliozela microphylla is a moth of the Heliozelidae family. It was described by Edward Meyrick in 1897. It is found in Western Australia.

References

Moths described in 1897
Heliozelidae